is a Japanese verb meaning "to know" or "understand". It is a common masculine Japanese given name. Satoru is the root of the Zen Buddhist word .

Possible writings
Satoru can be written using different kanji characters and can mean:
悟る, "be spiritually awakened" or "attain higher perception"
as a given name

悟, "enlightenment"
聡, "smart"
智, "wisdom"
知, "knowledge"
了, "understanding"
哲, "philosophy"
聖, "virtuous"
暁, "daybreak"
The name can also be written in hiragana or katakana.

People with the name

Satoru Abe (born 1926), American painter and sculptor
, Japanese scriptwriter, novelist and manga author
 Japanese professional wrestler
, Japanese footballer
, Japanese boxer
, Japanese politician
, Japanese sprinter
, fourth president and CEO of Nintendo
, Japanese table tennis player
Satoru Kobayashi (disambiguation), multiple people
, Japanese professional baseball player
, Japanese music composer
, Japanese ski jumper
, Japanese ice hockey player
, Japanese bioinformatician
, Japanese rower
, Japanese film maker
, Japanese racing driver
, Japanese swimmer
, Japanese manga artist
, Japanese footballer
, Japanese Yakuza leader
, general manager of Nintendo Research & Engineering
, a Japanese astronomer
, Japanese shogi player
, Japanese long-distance runner
, Japanese professional wrestler
, president of Nintendo of Europe
, Japanese hurdler
, Japanese speed skater
, Japanese football player
, Grand Chamberlain of Japan
, Japanese footballer

Fictional characters
, the main hero of the tokusatsu series GoGo Sentai Boukenger
, a character in the manga and anime series Ace of Diamond 
, a character in the manga and anime series Shion no Ō
Satoru Ikaruga (悟), the main character in the manga series D-Live!!
Satoru Kanzaki (悟), a character in the manga and anime series Area 88
, a character in the Japanese drama Atashinchi no Danshi 
, a character in the manga and anime series Gingitsune
, the main character in the manga, anime, and film Boku Dake ga Inai Machi
Satoru Arihara (在原 暁), the main character in the visual novel RIDDLE JOKER
Satoru Akefu (明負 悟), a major antagonist in the eighth part of JoJo's Bizarre Adventure series JoJolion 
Satoru Mikami (三上 悟), a character and Rimuru Tempest's previous self in That Time I Got Reincarnated as a Slime
Satoru Gojo (五条 悟), one of the protagonists in Jujutsu Kaisen
Satoru (サトル), a side character in the manga and anime series One Punch Man

See also
8485 Satoru, a main-belt asteroid

Japanese masculine given names